The Football Club Sarajevo - Butmir Training Centre is a compound consisting a number of sport facilities, serving as a training ground for FK Sarajevo. The camp is located in the neighbourhood of Butmir, which is part of the Ilidža municipality in the Sarajevo Canton, Bosnia and Herzegovina, and was officially opened on 24 October 2015, after the first stage of construction was completed. The centre is currently undergoing expansion, with the second of three construction phases underway.

History
When Vincent Tan purchased management rights for FK Sarajevo in late 2013, the lack of club owned training facilities was identified as a large obstacle to club aspirations and independency. FK Sarajevo had traditionally used the component facilities of the municipality owned Asim Ferhatović Hase Stadium which were considered outdated and did not allow for full organizational and financial independence. This fact led the club management headed by Tan and the Berjaya Group in search of a location for the construction of new and modern facilities. The neighbourhood of Butmir was eventually chosen because of its close proximity to the Sarajevo International Airport, the suburb of Ilidža and because of the already existing training grounds used by a private football academy run by former FK Sarajevo captain Predrag Pašić. The 17 acre  (70,000 square meter) land plot was jointly owned by the Ilidža municipality and a local agricultural co-op, but after negotiations the club purchased the land and began preparing the large construction project. On 24 December 2014 the club signed an agreement with construction contractors for the first phase of construction to begin in July of the same year. The first phase of construction, costing allegedly 8 million KM, was completed in August 2015. On 14 December 2015 the facilities were granted a FIFA PRO licence.

Facilities
The training centre holds an entrance gate leading to a large plaza, water fountain, botanical gardens, bus terminus and parking lot. The main facility building will consist of a 5-star hotel holding 15 rooms, 10 studio apartments, 2 VIP apartments, a restaurant with a kitchen, a VIP restaurant, indoor and outdoor cafés, Wellness centre, gym, one large and two smaller conference rooms and designated administration, technical and financial floors. The centre will further be composed of an indoor futsal arena, a beach football court, shooting area, tennis courts, two large artificial turf grounds and one large natural turf ground. Furthermore, a man-made hill with an adjacent park and bungalows will encompass the centre. The entrance, plaza and grounds are completed and in use, while the second phase of construction is underway, as of 28 July 2016. The main artificial turf pitch is named after club legend Želimir Vidović, who was killed during the Siege of Sarajevo while transporting wounded citizens to a nearby hospital.  A statue of Vidović was erected on the western grass knoll that encompasses the turf.

Other usage
Apart from the first team, the centre is home to the FK Sarajevo Academy which trains and plays home fixtures in the facility. With the completion of the project, the centre will also include a boarding facility for the academy members, consisting of the aforementioned bungalows. Furthermore, the centre hosts the women's team which trains and plays friendly fixtures on the facility pitches. The training camp is occasionally used by the Bosnia and Herzegovina national team.  It is important to note that the club employs war veterans from the Ilidža municipality in the training centre as a way of giving back to the community.

References

External links
  

FK Sarajevo
Butmir
Football venues in Bosnia and Herzegovina
Sport in Sarajevo
Youth football in Bosnia and Herzegovina
Football academies in Bosnia and Herzegovina